Panic is the second studio album by the electro swing group Caravan Palace, released on 5 March 2012 by Wagram Music.

Track listing

Personnel
Hugues Payen - violin
Arnaud Vial - guitar
Charles Delaporte - double bass
Camille Chapelière - clarinet
Antoine Toustou - trombone, drum machine
Aurélien - guitar, DJ
 Sonia Fernandez Velasco aka Zoé Colotis - vocalist

2012 albums
Caravan Palace albums